Into the Storm (V Buryu) is a 1939 Russian-language opera by Tikhon Khrennikov which won the approval of Stalin. Khrennikov composed the opera to a libretto by the dramatist  and original writer Nikolai Virta based on Virta's 1935 debut novel Loneliness (Одиночество»).

References

Compositions by Tikhon Khrennikov
Russian-language operas
Operas
1939 operas
Operas based on novels